Driver 76 is a video game for the PlayStation Portable, which was released on 8 May 2007 in the US, and on 11 May 2007 in the EU. The game is a prequel to Driver: Parallel Lines, and is set two years prior. It is the only game in the Driver series for the PSP. It was developed by Ubisoft Reflections and Sumo Digital, and published by Ubisoft.

Plot
In New York City 1976, the story starts with Ray, a wheelman. He falls in love with Chen Chi, but she's already got someone, Jimmy. After gaining respect from her father, Ray is betrayed and has to earn money in the meantime. He eventually meets back with Zhou, Chen Chi's father, he tells him of how Jimmy is a traitor and for the remainder of the game you must take down Jimmy's empire. After Jimmy is presumably killed in an explosion, Zhou gives Ray his blessing to go out with Chen Chi, but finds out that she has been kidnapped by a scarred Jimmy, however Ray manages to save Chen Chi and shoot down Jimmy's helicopter with a car.

Gameplay
Mission structure is similar to Driver: Parallel Lines, where driving is an important aspect in gameplay, shooting still remains in the game. Most missions are driving based while some are shootouts or when Ray sits in the back of a car and shoots incoming enemies.

One difference that sets Driver 76 from the rest of the Driver series is that it uses comic-styled illustrations rather than cinematic cutscenes, making the game behave more like a comic book.

There are 26 main missions, grouped into 6 chapters. The missions get harder as the player progresses through the chapters. Money, cars and weapons are rewarded if missions are successfully completed.

Setting
The design of New York City is similar to the previous installment, but since it is set two years before as a prequel, there are some differences. Mostly it is all the same, with a few differences in cars, buildings, landscape, and map.

Reception

Driver 76 received "mixed" reviews according to video game review aggregator Metacritic.

References

External links
 Driver official website
 Ubisoft's Driver 76 page
 

2007 video games
Driver (video game series)
Open-world video games
Organized crime video games
PlayStation Portable games
PlayStation Portable-only games
Ubisoft games
Video game prequels
Video games developed in the United Kingdom
Video games set in 1976
Video games set in New York City
Video games set in New Jersey
Sumo Digital games